SC 07 Bad Neuenahr was a German football club from Bad Neuenahr-Ahrweiler, Rhineland-Palatinate. The best-known section within the club was its women's football team, which was founded in 1969 and won the German Championship in 1978. Sportclub Bad Neuenahr was a founding member of Germany's women's Bundesliga and played in the top division from 1997 until 2013.

The men's side played second-division football in the first half of the 1950s as part of the 2. Liga-Südwest before slipping to the Amateurliga Rheinland in 1955. They generally earned upper table results there through the balance of the decade and on through the 1960s and 1970s. They took part in the opening round of the DFB-Pokal (German Cup) in 1975 when they were put out by FC St. Pauli. Their only other cup experience was in 1932 when they advanced to the quarter final of the regional Westpokal.

After the club's longtime president and athletic director Bernd Stemmeler died on 17 May 2013, on 27 May it filed for insolvency at the district court in Bad Neuenahr. A few weeks later, the club's management announced the voluntary withdrawal from the 2. Bundesliga and they subsequently liquidated. As a replacement, in the 2013–14 season a new club, SC 13 Bad Neuenahr was founded and entered the 2. Bundesliga South, carrying that name at beginning of the second half of the season.

Last squad

Former players

References

External links
 Official homepage of SC 13 Bad Neuenahr

 
Defunct football clubs in Germany
Defunct women's football clubs in Germany
Association football clubs established in 1907
Defunct football clubs in Rhineland-Palatinate
1907 establishments in Germany
Association football clubs disestablished in 2013
2013 disestablishments in Germany
Football clubs in Germany
Frauen-Bundesliga clubs